Locust Grove was a small town (now extinct) in Prairie Township, Warren County, in the U.S. state of Indiana, located three miles northeast of Tab.  A 1913 history describes the town's population as "less than a hundred", but all that remains at the site is the Locust Grove Church, Locust Grove Cemetery and a few homes.

Geography
Locust Grove is located at the intersection of County Roads 850 N and 600 W.  It sits in open farmland on a low, broad hill.

References
 Clifton, Thomas A. (editor) (1913), Past and Present of Fountain and Warren Counties, Indiana, Indianapolis: B. F. Bowen & Co.

Ghost towns in Indiana
Former populated places in Warren County, Indiana